Cartwright Air Station (ADC ID: N-27) is a closed General Surveillance Radar station. It was closed in 1968.

History
The site was established in 1953 as a General Surveillance Radar station, funded by the United States Air Force (USAF). It was used initially by the Northeast Air Command, which stationed the 922d Aircraft Control and Warning Squadron on the station on 1 October 1953. The station functioned as a Ground-Control Intercept (GCI) and warning station. As a GCI station, the squadron's role was to guide interceptor aircraft toward unidentified intruders picked up on the unit's radar scopes.

It was equipped with the following radars:
 Search Radar: AN/FPS-3C, AN/FPS-502, AN/FPS-20A, AN/FPS-87A, AN/FPS-93A
 Height Radar: AN/TPS-502, AN/FPS-6B, AN/FPS-90

The station was reassigned to the USAF Air Defense Command on 1 April 1957, and was given designation "N-27". In 1963, the site was connected to the Manual Data Center at Goose AFB.

In addition to the main facility, Cartwright operated several AN/FPS-14 manned Gap Filler sites:
 Cut Throat Island Air Station (N-27A): 
 Spotted Island Air Station (N-27B):  
 Fox Harbour Air Station (N-27C): 

On 18 June 1968, the USAF transferred control of the site to the Canadian Armed Forces. It was inactivated, closed and the remains of the station are abandoned.

USAF units and assignments

Units
 922d Aircraft Control and Warning Squadron, activated at Grenier AFB, New Hampshire, 26 May 1953
 Moved to Cartwright Air Station, 1 October 1953
 Discontinued,18 June 1968

Assignments
 4707th Air Defense Wing (ADC), 26 May 1953
 Northeast Air Command, 1 October 1953
 4732d Air Defense Group (ADC), 1 April 1957
 Goose Air Defense Sector, 1 April 1960
 37th Air Division, 1 April 1966 – 18 June 1968

North Warning System
The new site (LAB-6) consists of a radar towers, communications facility, and storage and tunnel connected buildings for personnel.

See also
 United States general surveillance radar stations

References

  A Handbook of Aerospace Defense Organization 1946 - 1980,  by Lloyd H. Cornett and Mildred W. Johnson, Office of History, Aerospace Defense Center, Peterson Air Force Base, Colorado
 Winkler, David F. (1997), Searching the skies: the legacy of the United States Cold War defense radar program. Prepared for United States Air Force Headquarters Air Combat Command.

External links

Installations of the United States Air Force in Canada
Radar stations of the United States Air Force
Aerospace Defense Command military installations
Military installations in Newfoundland and Labrador
Military installations established in 1953
Military installations closed in 1968
1953 establishments in Newfoundland and Labrador
1968 disestablishments in Newfoundland and Labrador